Murthy Devarakonda is a computer scientist at the AI Innovation Center of Novartis Pharmaceuticals, Cambridge, MA. He was named a Fellow of the Institute of Electrical and Electronics Engineers (IEEE) in 2015 for his contributions to measurement-based analytics of distributed systems for data center optimization.

References 

Fellow Members of the IEEE
Living people
Year of birth missing (living people)
Place of birth missing (living people)
American electrical engineers